Muhammad Basharat Raja(Punjabi:محمد بشارت راجہ) is a Pakistani politician who was the Provincial Minister of Punjab for Law and Parliamentary Affairs and Provincial Minister of Punjab for Baitul Maal and Social Welfare. He  had been a member of the Provincial Assembly of the Punjab from August 2018 till January 2023. He is the son of former Member of the National Assembly of Pakistan Raja Laal of Rawalpindi.

He was first elected as Chairman District Council Rawalpindi in 1979. Previously, he was a member of the Provincial Assembly of the Punjab from 1990 to 1999 and again from 2003 to 2007. He served as Provincial Minister of Punjab for Law and Parliamentary Affairs, and Minister for Information, Culture and Youth Affairs between 1997 and 1999 and served as Provincial Minister of Punjab for Local Government and Community Development, and minister for Law, Parliamentary Affairs and Public Prosecution between 2003 and 2007.
On 21 November 2020, he was appointed Provincial Minister of Punjab for Cooperatives.Now he is current provincial minister of  public prosecution and cooperatives Punjab in the cabinet of chief minister Punjab Ch Parvez Ilahi since 7 August 2022. He ceased to hold office on 22 December 2022.

Early and personal life
He was born on 11th August 1948 in Rawalpindi, Pakistan.
He belongs to powerful Dhami janjua Rajput tribe of Pothohar region. His tribe Dhamial Rajgan shares blood relations with other powerful Rajgans of Chakra, Ranial, Bijnial, Chak Jalal-uddin and other prominent dominating families of Rawalpindi. His tribe spreads over many villages of Rawalpindi, Chakwal, Jehlum areas. He is the son of former mpa Raja Laal khan. His uncle won the district elections before independence 1947.
He received the degree of Bachelor of Laws in 1976 from University of the Punjab.
He resides at Dhamial House Rawalpindi. A Public secretariat is also present beside his personal residence. He is the first cousin of former Tehsil Nazim Rawalpindi Hamid Nawaz Raja. His brother Raja Nasir is also a senior politician and served as special advisor to Chief Minister of Punjab.

Marriage controversy
In 2017, Seemal Raja, former Member of Punjab Assembly sent a defamation notice of Rs 2 billion to Raja and claimed that Raja had married with her in August 2014 but refused to publicly accept the marriage which damaged her reputation. She also accused Raja and his family of seizing her assets, including jewelry, cash and a vehicle. In July 2018, she claimed that Raja tortured her and expelled her out his house.

Political career 
He began his political career with the Pakistan Peoples Party (PPP) in 1970s and then joined Pakistan Muslim League (N) (PML-N).

He was elected to the Provincial Assembly of the Punjab as a candidate of Islami Jamhoori Ittehad (IJI) from Constituency PP-4 (Rawalpindi-IV) in 1990 Pakistani general election. He received 45,389 votes and defeated Zakir Hussain Shah.

He was re-elected to the Provincial Assembly of the Punjab as a candidate of PML-N from Constituency PP-4 (Rawalpindi-IV) in 1993 Pakistani general election. He received 47,811 votes and defeated Zakir Hussain Shah.

He was re-elected to the Provincial Assembly of the Punjab as a candidate of PML-N from Constituency PP-4 (Rawalpindi-IV) in 1997 Pakistani general election. He received 46,253 votes and defeated Zamarud Khan. During his tenure as member of the Punjab Assembly, he served in the provincial Punjab cabinet of Chief Minister Shehbaz Sharif as Provincial Minister of Punjab for Law and Parliamentary Affairs with the additional ministerial portfolio of Information, Culture and Youth Affairs.

He quit PML-N following 1999 Pakistani coup d'état and joined Pakistan Muslim League (Q) (PML-Q). Large number of his tribesman parted ways with him after this decision and decided to remain loyal with Mian Nawaz Sharif, joined Ch Nisar Ali Khan.

He ran for the seat of the Provincial Assembly of the Punjab as a candidate of PML-Q from Constituency PP-6 (Rawalpindi-VI) in 2002 Pakistani general election but was unsuccessful. He received 14,701 votes and lost the seat to Raja Arshad Mehmood, a candidate of PML-N.

On 3 January 2003, he was inducted into the provincial Punjab cabinet of Chief Minister Chaudhry Pervaiz Elahi and appointed as adviser to the chief minister of Punjab.

He was re-elected to the Provincial Assembly of the Punjab as a candidate of PML-Q from Constituency PP-110 (Gujrat-III) in by-polls held on 15 January 2003. He received 82,057 votes and defeated Chaudhry Tariq Javed, a candidate of PPP. He was accused of misusing the state machinery to win the election. During his tenure as member of the Punjab Assembly, he served as Provincial Minister of Punjab for Local Government and Community Development with the additional ministerial portfolio of Law, Parliamentary Affairs and Public Prosecution.

He ran for the seat of the National Assembly of Pakistan as a candidate of PML-Q from Constituency NA-54 (Rawalpindi–V) in 2008 Pakistani general election but was unsuccessful. He received 10,400 votes and lost the seat to Malik Ibrar Ahmed. In the same election, he also ran for the seat of the Provincial Assembly of the Punjab as a candidate of PML-Q from Constituency PP-6 (Rawalpindi-VI) but was unsuccessful He received 17,771 votes and lost the seat to Chaudhary Sarfraz Afzal.

He ran for the seat of the National Assembly as a candidate of PML-Q from Constituency NA-52 (Rawalpindi-III) in 2013 Pakistani general election but was unsuccessful. He received 43,866 votes and lost the seat to Nisar Ali Khan.

In June 2018, because of seat adjustment with PTI he contest the election on Pakistan Tehreek-e-Insaf (PTI) ticket.

He was re-elected to the Provincial Assembly of the Punjab as a candidate of PTI from Constituency PP-14 (Rawalpindi-IX) in 2018 Pakistani general election.but he is part of PML-Q 

On 27 August 2018, he was inducted into the provincial Punjab cabinet of Chief Minister Sardar Usman Buzdar and was appointed as Provincial Minister of Punjab for law and parliamentary affairs.

On 9 February 2019, he was given additional ministerial portfolio of Local Government and Community Development.

on 19 July 2019 He was removed from the charge of Provincial  Minister of Local Government and Community Development.

On 19 July 2019 He was given additional ministerial portfolio of Provincial Minister of Punjab for Baitul Maal  and  Social Welfare.

On 21 November 2020, He was given additional charge of Provincial Minister of Punjab for cooperatives.  Now he is  current provincial minister of public prosecution and cooperatives Punjab in the cabinet of chief minister Punjab Ch Parvez Ilahi since 7th August 2022 .

References

Living people
1951 births
Punjab MPAs 2018–2023
Punjab MPAs 1990–1993
Punjab MPAs 1993–1996
Punjab MPAs 1997–1999
Punjab MPAs 2002–2007
Pakistan Tehreek-e-Insaf MPAs (Punjab)
Pakistan Muslim League (N) MPAs (Punjab)
Pakistan Muslim League (Q) MPAs (Punjab)
Provincial ministers of Punjab
Government Gordon College alumni
University of the Punjab alumni